The Dalslands Fotbollförbund (Dalsland Football Association) is one of the 24 district organisations of the Swedish Football Association. It administers lower tier  football in the historical province of Dalsland.

Background 

Dalslands Fotbollförbund, commonly referred to as Dalslands FF, is the governing body for football in the historical province of Dalsland in Västra Götaland County. The Association currently has 35 member clubs.  Based in Mellerud, the Association's Chairman is Ingemar Carlsson.

Affiliated Members 

The following clubs are affiliated to the Dalslands FF:

Bengtsfors IF
Billingsfors IK
Bäckefors IF
Brålanda IF
Dals Långeds IK
DFC Rölanda
Eds FF
Edsleskogs IF
Ellenö IK
Färgelanda IF
Fengersfors IK
Frändefors IF
Gesäters IF
Gestad SK
Grane IK
Gustavsfors IF
H.E.F. Valbo BK
Håbols IF
Håfreströms IF
Högsäters GF
IF Viken
IFK Åmål
Kroppefjälls IF
Laxarby IF
Melleruds IF
Nössemarks IF
Rådanefors IF
Rölanda IF
Stigens IF
Stora Böns IK
Tösse IF
Valbo FC
Åsebro IF
Ärtemarks IF
Ödeborgs IF

League Competitions 
Dalslands FF run the following League Competitions:

Men's Football
Division 5  -  one section
Division 6  -  one section
Division 7  -  one section

Women's Football
Division 3  -  one section (with Bohusläns FF)
Division 4  -  one section (with Bohusläns FF)
Division 5  -  one section

Footnotes

External links 
 Dalslands FF Official Website 

Dalslands
Football in Västra Götaland County